The "spherium" model consists of two electrons trapped on the surface of a sphere of radius . It has been used by Berry and collaborators  to understand both weakly and strongly correlated systems and to suggest an "alternating" version of Hund's rule. Seidl studies this system in the context of density functional theory (DFT) to develop new correlation functionals within the adiabatic connection.

Definition and solution 
The electronic Hamiltonian in atomic units is

where  is the interelectronic distance.
For the singlet S states, it can be then shown that the wave function  satisfies the Schrödinger equation

Based on the known solutions of the Heun equation, we seek wave functions of the form

and substitution into the previous equation yields the recurrence relation

with the starting values . Thus, the Kato cusp condition is 
.

The wave function reduces to the polynomial

Thus, the energy  is a root of the polynomial equation  (where ) and the corresponding radius  is found from the previous equation which yields

 is the exact wave function of the -th excited state of singlet S symmetry for the radius .

This confirms the view that electron correlation on the surface of a sphere is qualitatively different from that in three-dimensional physical space.

Spherium on a 3-sphere

Loos and Gill considered the case of two electrons confined to a 3-sphere repelling Coulombically.

See also
List of quantum-mechanical systems with analytical solutions

References

Further reading

 

Quantum chemistry
Quantum models